Gustavo Testa (28 July 1886 – 28 February 1969) was an Italian prelate of the Catholic Church, who was made a cardinal in 1959. He spent his career in the Roman Curia. He entered the diplomatic service of the Holy See in 1920 and held several appointments as papal nuncio from 1934 to 1959. He headed the Congregation for the Oriental Churches from 1962 to 1968.

Biography 
Born to a wealthy family in Boltiere, in the province of Bergamo, Testa attended the Pontifical Lateran University, Pontifical Roman Athenaeum S. Apollinare, and Pontifical Biblical Institute in Rome. He was ordained to the priesthood on 28 October 1910, and finished his studies in 1912. After a period of pastoral work in Bergamo and teaching at its seminary, Testa entered the Roman Curia, in the Secretariat of State, in 1920. He then served as secretary of the nunciature to Austria until 1923. Testa was raised to the rank of privy chamberlain of his holiness on 28 October 1921, and later domestic prelate of his holiness on 18 May 1923. He was also named auditor for the Bavarian nuniciature in 1927 before becoming counselor of the nunciature to Italy in 1929.

On 4 June 1934, Testa was appointed Titular Archbishop of Amasea and Apostolic Delegate to Egypt, Arabia, Crete, Abyssinia, Palestine, Transjordan, and Cyprus. He received his episcopal consecration on the following 1 November from Cardinal Ildefonso Schuster, OSB, with Bishops Adriano Bernareggi and Angelo Roncalli serving as co-consecrators. Testa was later named the first Apostolic Delegate to Palestine, Transjordania and Cyprus when it was established on 11 February 1948, and Nuncio to Switzerland on 6 March 1953.

Pope John XXIII created him Cardinal-Priest of San Girolamo dei Croati in the consistory of 14 December 1959. On 4 October 1961, Cardinal Testa was made Pro-President of the Cardinalitial Commission for the Special Administration of the Holy See. Pope John appointed him Secretary of the Congregation for the Oriental Churches on 2 August 1962. Testa was one of the cardinal electors who participated in the 1963 papal conclave that elected Cardinal Montini as Pope Paul VI; during the conclave, Testa lost his temper and demanded that the opponents of continuing the Second Vatican Council stop blocking Montini's election. As Secretary of that Congregation, he accompanied Pope Paul on his journey to the Holy Land in 1964.

He became Pro-Prefect of the Congregation for the Oriental Churches in 1965 when Pope Paul VI decided to no longer reserve the title of Prefect to himself. From 1962 to 1965, he attended the Second Vatican Council. 

Pope Paul accepted his resignation as Pro-Prefect of the Congregation for the Oriental Churches on 13 January 1968, and then as Pro-President of the Special Administration of Holy See on 7 May 1968.

Testa died in Rome at age 82, and is buried in Bergamo.

Pope John XXIII
Testa had been a close friend of Pope John XXIII, also from Bergamo, since they were schoolmates in Rome.

Notes

References

External links 
 Cardinals of the Holy Roman Church
Catholic-Hierarchy 

1886 births
1969 deaths
Clergy from the Province of Bergamo
Apostolic Nuncios to Switzerland
Apostolic Nuncios to Egypt
Apostolic Nuncios to Cyprus
20th-century Italian cardinals
Participants in the Second Vatican Council
Members of the Congregation for the Oriental Churches
Grand Crosses 1st class of the Order of Merit of the Federal Republic of Germany
Cardinals created by Pope John XXIII
Pontifical Lateran University alumni
Pontifical Biblical Institute alumni